The McDonald Heights are broad, mainly snow-covered heights about  long and rising over  between Cape Burks and Morris Head on the coast of Marie Byrd Land, Antarctica. The heights are bounded southward by Hull Glacier, Kirkpatrick Glacier and Johnson Glacier. The feature was photographed from aircraft of the United States Antarctic Service, 1939–1941, was observed and partially mapped from  during February 1962, and was mapped in detail by the United States Geological Survey in 1965. The heights were named by the Advisory Committee on Antarctic Names after Captain Edwin A. McDonald, U.S. Navy, Deputy Commander of the U.S. Naval Support Force, Antarctica, in 1962, and Commander of the Task Unit that explored this coast aboard Glacier in February 1962.

See also
 Mount Rubin de la Borbolla
 Strawn Pass
 Zilch Cliffs

References

Mountains of Marie Byrd Land